Zaask is a beyond search platform to hire local service professionals. With Zaask, people can get quotes, compare and hire rated service professionals.

Overview

Reception
Zaask's home market is Portugal. It has been profiled in publications such as Publico, Metro, Exame Informática and Boas Noticias.

Geographic markets
As of 2015, Zaask is operational in Portugal, Spain, Germany, UK and Brazil.

References

External links
 

Freelance marketplace websites
Online marketplaces of Portugal